The Looney Tunes Hall of Fame is a 1991 feature film compilation of 15 classic animated short subjects from the Warner Bros. studio. The line-up of cartoons included in this anthology were A Wild Hare (1940), Birdy and the Beast (1944), Bugs Bunny Rides Again (1948), Rabbit Seasoning (1952), Feed the Kitty (1952), One Froggy Evening (1955), Duck Amuck (1953), Another Froggy Evening (1995), Fast and Furry-ous (1949), Ali Baba Bunny (1957), Knighty Knight Bugs (1958), High Diving Hare (1949), Bully for Bugs (1953) and Rabbit of Seville (1950). The Looney Tunes Hall of Fame offered audiences an opportunity to see the cartoons in a 35mm theatrical presentation.

References 

1991 films
1991 animated films
Bugs Bunny films
Daffy Duck films
Porky Pig films
Looney Tunes films
Warner Bros. animated films
Animated anthology films
Compilation films
1990s American animated films
1990s English-language films